Orlik, is a village in western Kazakhstan. It is the administrative center of Olrik Rural District (KATO code - 234047100), Inder District, Atyrau Region. Population:

Geography
Olrik is located on the right bank of the Ural River.

References

Populated places in Atyrau Region